Dave "Hawg" Hanner, born Joel David Hanner, (May 20, 1930 – September 11, 2008) was an American football player, coach and scout who spent nearly all of his 42-year career with the Green Bay Packers of the National Football League.

Early years
Born and raised in Parkin, Arkansas, Hanner grew up with four siblings on a family farm west of Memphis and played college football at the University of Arkansas.

Playing career
Selected in the fifth round of the 1952 NFL draft, 52nd overall, Hanner played defensive tackle for the Packers for 13 seasons, from 1952 to 1964, and was selected for the Pro Bowl in 1953 and 1954. He started at left defensive end in 1961 and 1962 for the team's first two National Football League championships under head coach Vince Lombardi. During his NFL career, Hanner played in 160 of 164 possible regular season games, missing three of those in his rookie season.

Coaching career
Following his playing career, Hanner spent 16 seasons as an assistant coach for the Packers. From 1965 through 1970, he was the defensive line coach. When Dan Devine took over as head coach in 1971, he was promoted to the defensive coordinator, a position he served in until 1974.  Bart Starr became the team's head coach in 1975 and Hanner remained as the assistant head coach and defensive coordinator. He was released after the 1979 season (and then worked for the rival Chicago Bears), but returned as the team's quality control assistant in 1982. He transferred into a scout role until he retired in 1996.

Hanner was inducted into both the Green Bay Packers Hall of Fame and the Arkansas Sports Hall of Fame.

Death
After being in poor health for an extended period, Hanner suffered a heart attack and died two days later on September 11, 2008. Age 78, he was survived by his wife, six children, seven grandchildren, and two great-grandchildren.

References

External links
 
 

1930 births
2008 deaths
People from Parkin, Arkansas
Players of American football from Arkansas
American football defensive tackles
Arkansas Razorbacks football players
Green Bay Packers players
Western Conference Pro Bowl players